Vice president of Kazakhstan was a political position in Kazakhstan from 1991 to 1996.In 1990-1991, there was also the post of vice-president of the Kazakh SSR. 

President Nursultan Nazarbayev issued a decree on 22 February 1996 removing Erik Asanbayev from his post.

According to Article 48 in the constitution the presidential line of succession is now as follows:

1) Chairman of the Senate of Kazakhstan
2) Chairman of the Majilis
3) The Prime Minister

See also
List of leaders of Kazakhstan
President of Kazakhstan
Prime Minister of Kazakhstan

References

Politics of Kazakhstan
Government of Kazakhstan
Vice presidents of Kazakhstan
Kazakhstan
1991 establishments in Kazakhstan
1996 disestablishments in Kazakhstan